Instituto Superior Santo Domingo (ISSD) is a 3-year private-technical institute located in Córdoba, Argentina. ISSD was founded in 1986 in the city of Córdoba as a private   third level education institute.

History

The institution had its birth in 1986, with the aim of offering education in the area of Computing-Computer Science and Telecommunication. The institution began its (unofficial) educational activities on August 11, 1986 with the name of CEPRICyC (Private Training Center and Computing).
In 1992 investigations were conducted to process the membership of formal education and under the supervision of official agency DIPE (Department of Private Colleges of the Province of Córdoba), under the Ministry of Education of the Province of Cordoba, the institute met all the requirements needed to become an official college, approving the respective inspections and finally began its (official) education activities in 1996.

Academics

ISSD is an official institution of the Argentine Republic, specialized in technological, business and telecommunications careers. Their academic offers are:
System Analyst (computing-computer science)
Software Development
Web Developer (computing-computer science)
Telecommunication
Business Management

References

Educational institutions established in 1986
1986 establishments in Argentina
Education in Argentina